Canterbury Spur is a flat-topped ridge leading north from the north face of Mount Glossopteris,  east of Discovery Ridge, Ohio Range. It was mapped by the United States Geological Survey from surveys and from U.S. Navy aerial photographs, 1958–59. The spur is named after the Canterbury Museum, Christchurch, New Zealand, home of the National Antarctic Exhibition, Research and Reference Centre. Geologists Jane Newman and Margaret Bradshaw of the Canterbury Museum worked on this ridge during the 1984–85 field season.

References 

Ridges of Marie Byrd Land